Robert David Hughes (born 1 February 1978) is a Welsh former footballer who played as a defender. He is currently a Professional Development Phase (U21) Coach with Manchester United after having held the position of Head of Academy Coaching at Cardiff City.

Playing career
Born in Wrexham, Hughes began his career at Aston Villa, where he played seven times during the 1996/97 season as a replacement for the injured Steve Staunton. He suffered with minor injuries over the next few years and made just one professional appearance in the following two years, playing in a 1–0 defeat to AFC Bournemouth on 28 March 1999 while on loan to League One side Carlisle United.

Finding his chances at Villa Park limited on his return he joined Shrewsbury Town on a free transfer, making his debut in a 4–1 defeat to Exeter City. He spent two years as a regular first-team choice and, in February 2001, he signed for Cardiff City for a fee of £450,000, £225,000 of which was given to Aston Villa due to a sell on clause, and went straight into the Bluebirds side but injuries struck again and after failing to regain his place in the side he was released in 2003 and subsequently retired.

Coaching career
Hughes was appointed the manager of Barry Town in 2003. After a short spell in charge he moved into an assistant manager role alongside Colin Addison who took over as manager in February 2004. However Addison left the club after just six months in charge and Hughes was re-instated as manager for a short time before he resigned in December 2004, along with the majority of the first-team squad, due to ongoing financial problems at the club.

In 2005, Hughes took a coaching role at Welsh Premier League side Port Talbot Town. He later made one appearance as a substitute for the side during the 2005–06 season.

Hughes later joined English League Two club Shrewsbury Town, spending two years as their head of youth development. He joined Championship side Watford as youth team coach in September 2011. He left the club in August 2014 to take up a position as Assistant Intermediate Team Manager for the Wales Under-21-Under-17 sides.

In December 2016, Hughes returned to Aston Villa as Under-18 team manager.

In July 2019, Hughes joined Southampton to become their first Head of Academy Player Development.

In November 2020, Hughes was appointed head of Academy Coaching at Cardiff City.

Career statistics

References

External links

Welsh Premier profile

1978 births
Living people
Footballers from Wrexham
Welsh footballers
Wales youth international footballers
Wales under-21 international footballers
Wales B international footballers
Association football defenders
Aston Villa F.C. players
Carlisle United F.C. players
Shrewsbury Town F.C. players
Cardiff City F.C. players
Barry Town United F.C. players
Premier League players
English Football League players
Cymru Premier players
Welsh football managers
Watford F.C. non-playing staff
Shrewsbury Town F.C. non-playing staff
Barry Town United F.C. managers
Cymru Premier managers
Port Talbot Town F.C. players